XHFP-FM is a radio station on 98.3 FM in Jalpa, Zacatecas, known as Radio Alegría.

History
XEFP-AM 1580 received its concession on November 25, 1974, with technical tests beginning on July 18 of that year. It was owned by Jorge Humberto González Bravo and operated with 2 kW day and 250 watts at night. The station was managed by the Díaz Alonso family; the youngest of three brothers, Sergio, died at the XEFP transmitter site the next year as a result of an electric shock. In 1982, XEFP moved to 990 kHz and boosted its power to 5,000 watts (in 1985) and finally in 1989, 10 kW day and 1 kW night. January 2007 saw XEFP move to new, purpose-built facilities in Jalpa.

XEFP was cleared to move to FM in February 2011.

References

Radio stations in Zacatecas
Radio stations established in 1974